King Arthur Castle is a  summit located in the Grand Canyon, in Coconino County of northern Arizona, US. It is situated one-half mile northwest of Guinevere Castle, one mile west of Excalibur, and two miles east-southeast of Holy Grail Temple, within the Shinumo Amphitheater. According to the Köppen climate classification system, King Arthur Castle is located in a cold semi-arid climate zone, with precipitation runoff draining west to the Colorado River via Shinumo Creek.

History

Clarence Dutton started the tradition of naming features in the Grand Canyon after mythological deities and heroic figures. King Arthur Castle was named in 1902 by Richard Tranter Evans (1881–1966), a cartographer who was mapping the Grand Canyon in the early 1900s, after the legendary fortress Camelot of the Legend of King Arthur, in keeping with his naming theme for other geographical features in the vicinity, e.g. Guinevere Castle, Elaine Castle, Excalibur, Gawain Abyss, Bedivere Point, Lancelot Point, Holy Grail Temple, and Galahad Point. This feature's name was officially adopted in 1908 by the U.S. Board on Geographic Names. Evans Butte, located three miles southwest of King Arthur Castle, is named after this same Richard T. Evans, who was a François E. Matthes protégé.

Guinevere Castle (elevation 7,281 ft), connected to King Arthur Castle by a high ridge, is named for Guinevere, the wife and queen of King Arthur. It was also named by Evans, and officially adopted in 1908.

The first ascent of King Arthur Castle was made in 1961 by Merrel Clubb, on his third attempt at it. It took him four days to climb it and was his final climb in the canyon. Harvey Butchart climbed both King Arthur Castle and Guinevere Castle on August 25, 1965, marking the 34th and 35th of the 83 summits he would climb in the Grand Canyon.

Geology

The summit is composed of Permian Kaibab Limestone and cream-colored Permian Coconino Sandstone. This sandstone, which is the third-youngest stratum in the Grand Canyon, was deposited 265 million years ago as sand dunes. Below the Coconino Sandstone is reddish slope-forming, Permian Hermit Formation, which in turn overlays the Pennsylvanian-Permian Supai Group. Further down are strata of the cliff-forming  Mississippian Redwall Limestone, Cambrian Tonto Group, and finally Proterozoic Unkar Group at creek level.

See also
 Geology of the Grand Canyon area

References

External links 

 Weather forecast: National Weather Service
 Photo of northeast aspect of King Arthur Castle, Guinevere Castle, and Excalibur from Galahad Point: Mountainproject.com
 Photo of King Arthur and Guinevere Castles by Harvey Butchart
 Harvey Butchart photo: Arthur from Guinevere
 King Arthur Castle photo by Harvey Butchart

Grand Canyon
Landforms of Coconino County, Arizona
Mountains of Arizona
Mountains of Coconino County, Arizona
North American 2000 m summits
Colorado Plateau
Grand Canyon National Park
Sandstone formations of the United States
Grand Canyon, North Rim
Grand Canyon, North Rim (west)